The Scripps Howard Fund is a public charity that supports philanthropic causes important to the E. W. Scripps Company, an American media conglomerate which owns television stations, cable television networks, and other media outlets. The goal of the Fund, according to its website, is "to advance the cause of a free press through support of excellence in journalism, quality journalism education and professional development." It is located in Cincinnati, Ohio, home to the Scripps Company. The Scripps Howard Foundation, an affiliated organization with the Scripps Howard Fund, supports Scripps’ charitable efforts through its endowment, key assets and major donations.

The foundation, started in 1962, started small but has grown to be the largest corporate foundation in the Greater Cincinnati area. Its annual budget has grown from $100,000 in 1971 to more than $100 million today. It also manages the Greater Cincinnati Fund and presents the annual National Journalism Awards, awarding a $175,000 for 17 prizes for the 2009 awards given in 2010.

The Scripps Howard Foundation, along with Roy Howard's children, established the Roy W. Howard Archive at the Indiana University School of Journalism in 1983. Additionally, they established the Scripps Howard School of Journalism and Communications at Hampton University in Virginia.

In 2018, the foundation established the Howard Center for Investigative Journalism at the University of Maryland Philip Merrill College of Journalism and Arizona State University Walter Cronkite School of Journalism and Mass Communication.

Awards
The foundation also has various award programs including the William Brewster Styles Award.

National Journalism Awards

The foundation annually awards the "Charles M. Schulz Award" to an student drawing cartoons for their college newspaper.  In 1997 the Award was for $2,000. In the 2000s it was for $10,000.

References

External links
 Scripps Howard Foundation website
 2015 Scripps Howard awards
 Howard Centers for Investigative Journalism

1962 establishments in Ohio
E. W. Scripps Company
Organizations established in 1962